The Taj Mahal Palace is a heritage, five-star, luxury hotel in the Colaba area of Mumbai, Maharashtra, India, situated next to the Gateway of India. Built in the Saracenic Revival style, it opened in 1903 as the Taj Mahal Hotel and has historically often been known simply as "The Taj". It has been considered one of the finest hotels in the East since the time of the British Raj. The hotel was one of the main sites targeted in the 2008 Mumbai attacks.

Part of the Taj Hotels Resorts and Palaces, the hotel has 560 rooms and 44 suites and is considered the flagship property of the group; it employs 1,600 staff. The hotel is made up of two different structures: the Taj Mahal Palace and the Tower, which are historically and architecturally distinct from each other (the Taj Mahal Palace was built in 1903; the Tower was opened in 1972).

The hotel has a long and distinguished history, having received many notable guests, from presidents to captains of industry and show business stars.
Along with that, the 26/11 attacks were happeningin this hotel too.

History

Early years

Pre Independence 
The Taj Mahal Hotel was commissioned by Jamsetji Tata and opened its doors to guests on 16 December 1903.

An oft-repeated story concerning the reasoning behind the construction of the hotel was Tata being refused admission into Watson's Hotel, as it was reserved for Europeans. However, the validity of this has been challenged by writer Charles Allen, who wrote that Tata was unlikely to care about such a slight to the extent that he would construct a new hotel. Instead, Allen writes, the Taj was built at the urging of editor of The Times of India who felt a hotel "worthy of Bombay" was needed and as a "gift to the city he loved" by Tata.

The original Indian architects were Sitaram Khanderao Vaidya and D. N. Mirza, and the project was completed by an English engineer, W. A. Chambers. The builder was Khansaheb Sorabji Ruttonji Contractor, who also designed and built its famous central floating staircase. The cost of construction was £250,000 (£127 million in 2008 prices).

Originally, the main entrance was on the land-facing side, where the pool now sits.

The original clientele were mainly the Europeans, the Maharajas and the social elites. Many world-renowned personalities from all fields have since stayed there, from Somerset Maugham and Duke Ellington to Lord Mountbatten and Bill Clinton.

When it opened in 1903, the Taj Mahal Hotel was the first in India to have electricity, American fans, German elevators, Turkish baths and English butlers. Later, it also had the city's first licensed bar, India's first all-day restaurant, and India's first discotheque, Blow Up. Initially in 1903, it charged 13 for rooms with fans and attached bathrooms, and 20 with full board. During World War I, the hotel was converted into a military hospital with 600 beds.

Between 1915 and 1919, work proceeded at Apollo Bundar, to reclaim the land behind the hotel where the Gateway of India was built in 1924. The Gateway of India soon became a major focal point in Bombay.

1950-1970 
By 1966, the Taj Mahal Hotel had become neglected and run-down, perhaps as a result of losing the British customers after Indian independence. The Taj Mahal Hotel was home to legendary jazz musician Micky Correa, "The Sultan of Swing", from 1936 to 1960.

Expansion

Management of the Taj Mahal Hotel was franchised to Pan Am's Inter-Continental Hotels division in 1972 and it was renamed The Taj Mahal Inter-Continental, with the new tower wing opening that same year.

Known today as The Taj Mahal Tower, it was designed jointly by Daraius Batliwala & Rustom Patell, with the latter having a greater focus later on. The Tower was built on the site of the historic Green's Hotel, constructed as flats in 1890, and operated by Tata as a hotel from 1904 until its demolition to build the Tower.

In the 1970s, Taj Hotels Resorts and Palaces was reorganised. The company built new properties and converted palaces into heritage hotels. In 1980, the chain expanded overseas. The franchise agreement with Inter-Continental ended in 1995 and the hotel again became the Taj Mahal Hotel.

In 2003, in honour of the hotel's centennial, it was renamed The Taj Mahal Palace & Tower.

The hotel received extensive international exposure in 2008 during a terrorist attack and reopened after extensive repairs.

2008 Mumbai attacks 

Taj Mahal Palace Hotel was specifically chosen by Lashkar-e-Taiba, a terror group who attacked multiple targets, for an attack intended to strike "a blow against a symbol of Indian wealth and progress". The hotel was attacked on 26 November 2008, during which material damage occurred, including the destruction of the hotel's roof in the hours following. Hostages were taken during the attacks, and at least 167 people were killed, including many foreigners. The casualties were mostly Indian citizens, although westerners carrying foreign passports were singled out. Indian commandos killed the terrorists barricaded in the hotel, to end the three-day battle on 29 November. At least 31 died at the Taj. Approximately 450 people were staying in the Taj Mahal Palace and Hotel at the time of the siege. The attack was planned using information compiled by David Headley, a Pakistani-American, who had stayed at the hotel multiple times.

Soon after this on 30 November, Tata chairman Ratan Tata said in an interview with CNN's Fareed Zakaria that they had received advance warning of the attacks and that some countermeasures had been taken. These may have been relaxed before the attack, but in any case were easily sidestepped by the operatives.

The less-damaged sections of the Taj Mahal Palace and Tower hotel reopened on 21 December 2008. It took several months to rebuild the popular heritage section of the Taj Mahal Palace Hotel.

Hillary Clinton visited Mumbai in July 2009, aiming to deepen India – United States relations and stayed at the Taj hotel; she also attended a commemoration event. She said, "I wanted to send a message that I personally and our country is in sympathy and solidarity with the employees and the guests of the Taj who lost their lives … with the people of Mumbai." On 15 August 2010, India's Independence Day, the Taj Mahal Palace was reopened after restoration. The cost of the restoration of the hotel so far has been 1.75 billion rupees. The palace wing has been restored and offers new hotel services.

In March 2010, as restoration work neared completion, the hotel dropped the word "Tower" from its name and became The Taj Mahal Palace.

On 6 November 2010, U.S. president Barack Obama became the first foreign head of state to stay at the Taj Mahal Palace after the attacks. In a speech from the terrace of the hotel, Obama said that "the Taj has been the symbol of the strength and the resilience of the Indian people."
The attack on the hotel is portrayed in the 2018 movie Hotel Mumbai.

Recent history
In 2017, the Taj Mahal Palace Hotel acquired an image trademark, the first building in the country to secure intellectual-property-right protection for its architectural design.

In media 
 
 The hotel is the primary setting of the novel Night in Bombay (1940) by the American novelist Louis Bromfield.
 It has also been mentioned in the short story "Sahab Bahadur" by Indian writer Sultan Rashed Mirza, Farhat Ullah Baaaig, and in the novel Delinquent Chacha by Ved Mehta.
 It was portrayed as a dream destination for a schoolboy to visit in the Marathi movie Taryanche Bait.
 Michael Palin spent the night in the hotel in episode 4 of Michael Palin: Around the World in 80 Days.
 The hotel is the setting for the 2015 film Taj Mahal.
 The hotel is the setting for the 2018 film Hotel Mumbai about the attacks, starring Dev Patel and Armie Hammer.
 Hotel Grand Palace is another name for Hotel Taj Mahal. This name has been used by people as a translation of the Hindi version of Taj Mahal, especially by authors. Such authors as Jeffrey Archer have used this term in their novels.
The hotel was the subject of a four-part BBC Two fly on the wall documentary series starting in August 2014, called Hotel India.
The hotel was a shooting location for Christopher Nolan film Tenet, released in August 2020.

Gallery

See also 

 Leopold Cafe
 Chhatrapati Shivaji Terminus
 Oberoi Trident

References 

"Most expensive hotel in India"

External links 

The Leading Hotels of the World
1903 establishments in India
2008 Mumbai attacks
Hotels established in 1903
Hotel buildings completed in 1903
Hotels in Mumbai
Taj Hotels Resorts and Palaces
Indo-Saracenic Revival architecture
20th-century architecture in India

he:מתקפת הטרור במומבאי (2008)#מלון טאג' מאהל